Tobias G. Natter (born 26 May 1961 in Dornbirn, Vorarlberg) is an Austrian art historian and internationally renowned art expert with a particular expertise in "Vienna 1900".

Career 
Natter studied art history and history at the universities of Innsbruck, Munich, and Vienna and graduated with a PhD in 1988. His museum career started at the Wien Museum, after which he spent 15 years with the Österreichische Galerie Belvedere in Vienna, serving ultimately as the museums´s head curator. Natter was also a consultant and frequent guest curator for the Jewish Museum Vienna, which was re-established in 1990. In 2001, he was invited by the Neue Galerie New York, founded by Ronald S. Lauder and Serge Sabarsky, to organize the museum's first loan exhibition devoted to Oskar Kokoschka. In 2006 Natter joined the Vorarlberg Museum as director launching the museum's architectural extension and repositioning. In 2011 he was assigned artistic director of the Leopold Museum in Vienna where he continued to develop the museum's profile and broadened the exhibition policy with uncommon shows such as nude men (2012/13). On October 28, 2013, he declared his dismissal from this function due to turbulence with his CFO Peter Weinhäupl and Weinhäupl's involvement with the Gustav Klimt Wien 1900 Privatstiftung featuring the Klimt collection of Gustav Ucicky, a prominent figure of Nazi filmmaking.

In 2014 he founded Natter Fine Arts, a company specializing in the development of exhibitions and the evaluation of art works. Most recently he curated amongst others exhibitions for the Schirn Kunsthalle Frankfurt (2016/17), the Neue Galerie New York (2017), the Österreichische Galerie Belvedere Vienna (2017), the Fine Arts Museums of San Francisco (2017/18) and the Kunsthaus Zurich (2021). 

Natter was entrusted with the estate appraisal of major Austrian artists such as Maria Lassnig (1919-2014), Ernst Fuchs (1930-2015), and Anton Lehmden (1929-2018). As part of his extensive writings, he published the current catalogue raisonné of the paintings by Gustav Klimt (2012) and Egon Schiele (2017) both of which are available in several languages.

In 2011 Natter was enrolled as a certified court expert for Austrian art from 1800 until today and is often consulted in provenance issues.

Awards 
2018: awarded the title Professor by the Austrian Federal President.

Books 
 Hodler, Klimt und die Wiener Werkstätte, ed. on behalf of the Kunsthaus Zürich, Scheidegger & Spiess, Zürich 2021 .
 The Self-Portrait: From Schiele to Beckmann, ed. on behalf of the Neue Galerie New York, Prestel, Munich e.a. 2019 .
 Egon Schiele: The Complete Paintings 1909 – 1918, Taschen, Cologne 2017, .
 Gustav Klimt:  The Complete Paintings, Taschen, Cologne 2012, .
 Die Welt von Klimt, Schiele und Kokoschka. Sammler und Mäzene, DuMont, Cologne 2003, .

As editor 
 Klimt & Rodin: An Artistic Encounter, ed. together with Max Hollein, DelMonico Books - Prestel Verlag, München, 2017, .
 Klimt and Antiquity: Erotic Encounters, ed. together with Stella Rollig, Prestel, Munich, 2017, .
 Art for all. The Colour Woodcut in Vienna around 1900, ed. together with Max Hollein and Klaus Albrecht-Schröder, Taschen, Cologne 2016, .
 Fürstenglanz. Die Macht der Pracht, ed. together with Agnes Husslein-Arco, Belvedere, Vienna 2016, .
 Kokoschka. Das Ich im Brennpunkt, ed. together with Franz Smola, Christian Brandstätter Verlag, Vienna 2013, .
 Wolken. Welt des Flüchtigen, ed. together with Franz Smola, Hatje Cantz, Ostfildern 2013, .
 Das Schaudepot. Zwischen offenem Magazin und Inszenierung, ed. together with Michael Fehr and Bettina Habsburg-Lothringen, transcript Verlag, Bielefeld 2010, .
 Schnee. Rohstoff der Kunst, Hatje Cantz, Ostfildern 2009, .
 Gustav Klimt. Painting, Design and Modern Life, ed. together with Christoph Grunenberg, Tate Publishing, London 2008, .
 Rabbiner - Bocher - Talmudschüler. Bilder des Wiener Malers Isidor Kaufmann. 1853-1921, edited on behalf of the Jewish Museum Vienna 1995, .

Exhibit catalogs 
 Klimt and The Women of Vienna´s Golden Age: 1900–1918, edited on behalf of the Neue Galerie New York, Prestel Verlag, München, 2016, .
 Nude Men: from 1800 until the present day, ed. together with Elisabeth Leopold, Hirmer, Munich 2012, .
 Gold. Schatzkunst zwischen Bodensee und Chur, exhibition catalog Vorarlberg Museum. Hatje-Cantz, Ostfildern 2007, .
 Angelica Kaufmann. A Woman of Immense Talent, exhibition catalog Vorarlberg Museum. Hatje-Cantz, Ostfildern 2007, .
 Gustav Klimt and The Dialogues of the Heterae. Erotic Boundaries in Vienna Around 1900, in: Renée Price (Ed.): Gustav Klimt. The Ronald S. Lauder and Serge Sabarsky Collections. exhibition catalog Neue Galerie New York. Prestel, Munich, 2007, .
 Die Tafelrunde. Egon Schiele und sein Kreis, together with Thomas Trummer, exhibition catalog Österreichische Galerie Belvedere. DuMont, Cologne 2006, .
 nach Schiele, ed. together with Thomas Trummer, exhibition catalog Österreichische Galerie Belvedere. DuMont, Cologne 2006, .
 Die nackte Wahrheit. Klimt, Schiele, Kokoschka und andere Skandale, ed. together with Max Hollein, exhibition catalog Schirn Kunsthalle Frankfurt and Leopold Museum, Vienna. Prestel, Munich, 2005, .
 Schiele & Roessler. Der Künstler und sein Förderer. Kunst und Networking im frühen 20. Jahrhundert, ed. together with Ursula Storch, exhibition catalog Historisches Museum Wien. Hatje Cantz, Ostfildern 2004, .
 Oskar Kokoschka. The Early Portraits 1909–1914, exhibition catalog Neue Galerie New York and Hamburger Kunsthalle. DuMont, Cologne 2001, .
 Klimt und die Frauen, ed. together with Gerbert Frodl, exhibition catalog Österreichische Galerie Belvedere. DuMont, Cologne 2000, .
 Max Liebermann und die französischen Impressionisten, ed. together with Julius H. Schoeps, exhibition catalog Jewish Museum Vienna. DuMont, Cologne 1997, .
 Chaim Soutine. Ein französischer Expressionist, exhibition catalog Jewish Museum Vienna, Vienna 2000, .
 Kokoschka und Wien, exhibition catalog Österreichische Galerie Belvedere, Wien 1996, .
 aufBRÜCHE. Österreichische Malerei und Plastik der 50er Jahre, exhibition catalog Österreichische Galerie Belvedere, Vienna 1994, .

References

External links 
 Literature by Tobias G. Natter in the catalogue of the German National Library
 Literature by Tobias G. Natter in the catalogue of the Austrian libraries association
 Website Tobias G. Natter

1961 births
Living people
People from Dornbirn
Austrian art historians